Air Magic Ultralights was an American aircraft manufacturer based in Houston, Texas. When it existed the company specialized in the design and manufacture of ultralight aircraft.

In the late 1990s, the company produced both the Spitfire designed by Fred Bell and the Spitfire II two seater. Both designs were constructed from bolted aluminium tubing covered in Dacron fabric.

By 1998, the company reported that it had delivered a total of 582 aircraft.

Aircraft

References

Defunct aircraft manufacturers of the United States
Manufacturing companies based in Houston
Ultralight aircraft
Homebuilt aircraft